is a Japanese manga artist, known for creating the manga series The Prince of Tennis. On February 26, 2023, it was reported Konomi is unable to walk anymore and has to use a wheelchair.

Financial standing
Every year the National Tax Agency releases a list of the highest income tax payers for entertainers in Japan. The higher someone's income tax, the higher their actual presumed earnings; however it is possible for a person to have paid more taxes than another person who made more money. Takeshi Konomi placed number nine on this list in 2002. On January 15, 2014, Takeshi announced that he would return to Shueisha's Weekly Shōnen Jump magazine.

Works
The Prince of Tennis, a manga about tennis and at one time the most popular sports manga in Japan (July 1999 – March 2008)
The Prince of After School, a spin-off of The Prince of Tennis (November 2008 – present)
The Prince of Tennis II, a continuation of The Prince of Tennis (March 2009 – present)
Cool -Rental Body Guard-
Moon Walker, a one-shot manga

References

External links 
The Princess of Tennis - book written by an American that worked as Konomi's assistant.

Living people
1970 births
Manga artists from Osaka Prefecture
People from Toyonaka, Osaka